Veettumrugam is a 1969 Indian Malayalam film, directed by P. Venu and produced by P. Sukumaran and G. Arjunan. The film stars Sathyan, Madhu, Sharada and Jayabharathi in the lead roles. The film had musical score by G. Devarajan.

Cast

Sathyan
Madhu
Sharada
Jayabharathi
Adoor Bhasi
P. J. Antony
Sankaradi
Shobha
T. R. Omana
Raghavan
Janardanan
Kaduvakulam Antony
Kamaladevi
Nellikode Bhaskaran
Radhamani

Soundtrack
The music was composed by G. Devarajan and the lyrics were written by P. Bhaskaran.

References

External links
 

1969 films
1960s Malayalam-language films
Films directed by P. Venu